Ina Maud Sheldon-Williams nee Thomson (1876–1956) was a British artist, known for her travel and landscape  paintings.

Biography 
Ina Sheldon-Williams was born in Ardrishaig, Argyll, in Scotland. She studied at the Slade School of Fine Art in London from 1895 to 1898 and also studied in Paris. She was widely travelled both throughout her life, in Britain, Italy and India. 

Ina Maud Thomson married Inglis Sheldon-Williams (1870-1940) in 1904 and they resided in England for the following decade. Inglis Sheldon-Williams was also an artist and a military figure, who had once studied with Thomas Brock before enrolling at the Slade. He was a war correspondent during the Second Boer War and the 1904 Russo-Japanese War. During the First World War he worked as a war artist for the Canadian forces in France. 

In 1926, Sheldon-Williams exhibited a painting of the Italian and French Alps alongside her husband's war drawings at Messrs. W. J. Walter's New Gallery. Sheldon-Williams presented studies of an Indian figure for an exhibition in 1935. Established by Kenneth Clark in the early 1940s, Sheldon-Williams contributed to the Recording Britain scheme during the Second World War. She exhibited paintings on a regular basis in group and solo shows at the Royal Academy in London, with the New English Art Club, the Fine Art Society and at Walker's Galleries, the Kensington Gallery and elsewhere. In July 2012, Sheldon-Williams' work was exhibited alongside work by Elisabeth Frink at Buxton Museum and Art Gallery. 

Sheldon-Williams had two daughters, Eve and Christina. Sheldon-Williams' daughter Eve was an artist and lecturer. Her granddaughter, Fran Hickox, is also an artist.

Works in public collections 
Ina Sheldon-Williams' work is held in public collections in both the United Kingdom and Canada.

References

External links

1876 births
1956 deaths
20th-century Scottish painters
20th-century Scottish women artists
Alumni of the Slade School of Fine Art
Scottish women painters
People from Knapdale